The Time Out Comedy Awards were bestowed upon the comedy community by the London listings magazine Time Out. They ran from 1991 to 2006, and include many well-known comedians as past winners: Eddie Izzard, Noel Fielding and Jimmy Carr. It is not known why they have been defunct since 2006.

Winners

1991
 Pat Condell
 Eddie Izzard
 Martin Soan

1992
 Boothby Graffoe
 Lee Evans
 Richard Morton
 Mark Hurst -Outstanding Contribution to Comedy

1993
 Simon Bligh
 Felix Dexter
 Kevin Day

1994
 Harry Hill
 Owen O'Neill
 Phill Jupitus

1995
 Bill Bailey
 Sean Lock

1996
Best character comedian 
 Al Murray

Best stand-up 
 Paul Tonkinson

Special award: 
 Peter Grahame

1997

Best stand-up 
 Sean Meo

Best female comic 
 Mandy Knight

Best comedy club 
 Banana Cabaret

1998
Outstanding achievement 
 Malcolm Hardee

Best stand-up
 Adam Bloom

Best comedy performer 
 Phil Nichol

2001

Best stand-up 
 Omid Djalili

Best comedy performances 
 Lee Mack

Outstanding achievement award 
 Lee Hurst

2002
Best stand-up 
 Mike Wilmot

Best comedy performances 
 Daniel Kitson

Outstanding achievement award 
 Andy Parsons

2003
Best stand-up 
 Jimmy Carr

Best comedy performances 
 Milton Jones

Outstanding achievement award 
 Noel Fielding

2004
Special award for outstanding achievement
 Will Smith

Best stand-up 
 Stephen K. Amos

Best comedy performances
 Julia Morris

2006
Best stand-up
 Russell Brand

Best comedy performance
 Marcus Brigstocke

Outstanding achievement 
 Robin Ince

Best newcomer 
 Danielle Ward

External links
 Official website
 Chortle's page for the Time Out Comedy Awards

British comedy and humour awards
London awards
Awards established in 1991
1991 establishments in England